The 1989 Chatham Cup was the 62nd annual nationwide knockout football competition in New Zealand.

Up to the last 16 of the competition, the cup was run in three regions (northern, central, and southern). National League teams received a bye until the final 64 stage. In all, 153 teams took part in the competition, outstripping the previous year's record of 147.

The 1989 final

From this year, the final reverted to a single game, rather than a two-legged tie as had been the case for the previous three years' competitions. The final was very one-sided, with Christchurch United equalling the record of seven goals set by Seatoun in 1958. The aggregate of eight goals in the final also equalled the competition record. Mike McGarry became the tenth player to score a Chatham Cup final hat-trick, the first since Graham Dacombe's four goals - also for Christchurch United - in 1972. Christchurch United's Johan Verweij became the first player to score in three successive Chatham Cup finals. Steve Sumner also entered the record books by being the first player to pick up a sixth cup-winner's medal.

The match went according to the form-book. Despite their fairy-tale run to the final, northern league side Rotorua City were no match for the previous year's national league champions. City keeper Dave Harris had a busy day, and despite making several good saves it was 5–0 by the half-time break, with goals from Keith Braithwaite, McGarry (twice), Verweij, and Laurence Fitzpatrick. In the second spell Steve Sumner added his name to the scorebook before McGarry completed his hat-trick. A Shane Zohs penalty in the 80th minute was a mere consolation for a Rotorua side well beaten.

The Jack Batty Memorial Trophy for player of the final was awarded to Mike McGarry of Christchurch United.

Results

Third round

* Won on penalties by Porirua (5-3) and Roslyn-Wakari (5-4)

Fourth round

* Won on penalties by Woolston (4-1)

Fifth round

Sixth Round

Semi-finals

Final

References

Rec.Sport.Soccer Statistics Foundation New Zealand 1989 page
UltimateNZSoccer website 1989 Chatham Cup page

Chatham Cup
Chatham Cup
Chatham Cup
Chat